At the 1928 Summer Olympics in Amsterdam, seven fencing events were contested, six for men and one for women.

Medal summary

Men's events

Women's events

Participating nations
A total of 259 fencers (232 men, 27 women) from 27 nations competed at the Amsterdam Games:

Medal table

References

 
1928 Summer Olympics events
1928
1928 in fencing
International fencing competitions hosted by the Netherlands